Standoff weapons are missiles or bombs which may be launched from a distance sufficient to allow attacking personnel to evade the effect of the weapon or defensive fire from the target area. Typically, they are used against land- and sea-based targets in an offensive operation. The name is derived from their ability to engage the target while standing off outside the range at which the defenders are likely to engage the attacker. Typical stand-off weapons include cruise missiles, glide bombs and short-range ballistic missiles.

Standoff missiles belong to the larger class of ranged weapons.

Types of missiles
 Air-Sol Moyenne Portée (French air-launched nuclear missile)
 AGM-28 Hound Dog
 AGM-69 SRAM
 AGM-86 ALCM
 AGM-129 ACM
 AGM-154 JSOW
 AGM-158 JASSM
 AGM-181 LRSO
 BrahMos
  Babur
 B61 nuclear bomb with mod-12 tail guidance kit.
 Blue Steel
 Umbani
 DRDO SAAW
 GAM-87 Skybolt
 H-2 SOW
 H-4 SOW
 Ra'ad Mk-1
 Ra'ad Mk-2
 Takbir
 Barq
  Babur-1
  Babur-1A
  Babur-2
  Babur-3
  GIDS REK
 Joint Strike Missile
 Raduga Kh-20
 Raduga Kh-22
 Raduga KSR-5
 Raduga Kh-55
 Raduga Kh-15
 Rudram-1
 Nirbhay
 SOM missile
 Standoff Land Attack Missile
 Storm Shadow
 KEPD 350
 YJ-18

References

Guided missiles